There are several named highways in the country of Suriname.

Afobakaweg 
The Afobakaweg is a paved 2-lane road connecting Paranam with Afobaka, the location of the Afobaka Dam. The road connects northwards to Paramaribo and the East-West Link. The Afobakaweg has two major branches: One paved branch leads to Brokopondo, and another paved branch leads to Pokigron via Brownsweg. A further extension of the Pokigron branch to Brazil via Vier Gebroeders is as of May 2020 still in the planning phase.

Desiré Delano Bouterse Highway 

On 15 May 2020, the Desiré Delano Bouterse Highway opened, and is the first motorway of Suriname, providing a faster connection between Paramaribo and the Johan Adolf Pengel International Airport.

East-West Link 

A major road is the 2-lane East-West Link connecting Albina to Nieuw Nickerie. The road was fully paved on 17 December 2009. There is a Southern East-West Link connecting Paramaribo with Apoera via Bitagron, however it is mainly unpaved.

Statistics 
 total: 4,304 km (2003)
 paved: 1,119 km (2003)
 highway: 9.6 km (2020)
 unpaved: 3,174 km (2003)

NOTE: Driving is on the left. Suriname and its neighbour Guyana are the only two countries on the (in-land) American continent which still drive on the left.

Road links with adjacent countries 

  Guyana - Yes, ferry from Nieuw-Nickerie to Corriverton.
  Brazil - None.
  French Guiana - Yes, ferry from Albina to Saint-Laurent-du-Maroni.

References 

Roads in Suriname